Different command-line argument parsing methods are used by different programming languages to parse command-line arguments.

Programming languages

C

C uses argv to process command-line arguments.

An example of C argument parsing would be:
#include <stdio.h>
int main (int argc, char *argv[])
{
    int count;
    for (count=0; count<argc; count++)
        puts (argv[count]);
}
C also has functions called getopt and getopt_long.

C#
class TestClass
{
    static void Main(string[] args)
    {
        // Display the number of command line arguments.
        Console.WriteLine(args.Length);
    }
}

Java
An example of Java argument parsing would be:
public class Echo {
    public static void main (String[] args) {
        for (String s: args) {
            System.out.println(s);
        }
    }
}

Kotlin
Here are some possible ways to print arguments in Kotlin:

fun main(args: Array<String>) = println(args.joinToString())

fun main(args: Array<String>) = println(args.contentToString())

fun main(args: Array<String>) {
    for (arg in args)
        println(arg)
}

Perl
Perl uses @ARGV.

foreach $arg (@ARGV)GT
{
    print $arg;
}FT
or
foreach $argnum (0 .. $#ARGV)ST
{
    print $ARGV[$argnum];
}

AWK
AWK uses ARGV also.

BEGIN {
   for ( i = 0; i < ARGC; i++ )
   {
       print ARGV[i]
   }
}

PHP
PHP uses argc as a count of arguments and argv as an array containing the values of the arguments. To create an array from command-line arguments in the -foo:bar format, the following might be used:

$args = parseArgs($argv);
echo getArg($args, 'foo');

function parseArgs(array $args)
{
    foreach ($args as $arg) {
        $tmp = explode(':', $arg, 2);
        if ($arg[0] === '-') {
            $args[substr($tmp[0], 1)] = $tmp[1];
        }
    }
    return $args;
}

function getArg(array $args, string $arg)
{
    if (isset($args[$arg])) {
        return $args[$arg];
    }
    return false;
}

PHP can also use getopt().

Python
Python uses sys.argv, e.g.:
import sys
for arg in sys.argv:
    print arg

Python also has a module called argparse in the standard library for parsing command-line arguments.

Racket
Racket uses a current-command-line-arguments parameter, and provides a racket/cmdline library for parsing these arguments.  Example:
#lang racket

(require racket/cmdline)

(define smile? (make-parameter #t))
(define nose?  (make-parameter #false))
(define eyes   (make-parameter ":"))

(command-line #:program "emoticon"

              #:once-any ; the following two are mutually exclusive
              [("-s" "--smile") "smile mode" (smile? #true)]
              [("-f" "--frown") "frown mode" (smile? #false)]

              #:once-each
              [("-n" "--nose") "add a nose"  (nose? #true)]
              [("-e" "--eyes") char "use <char> for the eyes" (eyes char)])

(printf "~a~a~a\n"
        (eyes)
        (if (nose?) "-" "")
        (if (smile?) ")" "("))
The library parses long and short flags, handles arguments, allows combining short flags, and handles -h and --help automatically:
$ racket /tmp/c -nfe 8
8-(

Rexx
Rexx uses arg, e.g.:
do i=1 to words(arg(1))
	say word(arg(1), i)
end

Rust
The args are in env::args().
use std::env;

fn main() {
    let args: Vec<String> = env::args().collect();

    let query = &args[1];
    let file_path = &args[2];

    println!("Searching for {}", query);
    println!("In file {}", file_path);
}

Node.js
JavaScript programs written for Node.js use the process.argv global variable.

// argv.js
console.log(process.argv);

$ node argv.js one two three four five
[ 'node',
  '/home/avian/argvdemo/argv.js',
  'one',
  'two',
  'three',
  'four',
  'five' ]

Node.js programs are invoked by running the interpreter node interpreter with a given file, so the first two arguments will be node and the name of the JavaScript source file. It is often useful to extract the rest of the arguments by slicing a sub-array from process.argv.

// process-args.js
console.log(process.argv.slice(2));

$ node process-args.js one two=three four
[ 
  'one',
  'two=three',
  'four' ]

References

Command shells
Articles with example Java code
Articles with example PHP code
Articles with example Python (programming language) code
Articles with example Racket code